Kate Quartey-Papafio is a co-founder of Ghanaian cabling company Reroy Cables. In 2021, Kate was listed as one of the five richest women in Ghana with a net worth of $250 million.

Career and honors 
Kate started Reroy Cables with her husband in 1992,  after they failed to get a suitable cables for the construction of their house. She's the first female CEO of a cable manufacturing firm in ECOWAS. In 2014, she was named the marketing woman of the year by the Chartered Institute of Marketing Ghana (CIMG). In the same year, during the maiden edition of the Osagyefo Kwame Nkrumah African Genius Award, she won the entrepreneurship category. In 2016, the Europe Business Assembly, which sells "fake awards", awarded her the best enterprise award.

In 2017, Kate,William Ato Essien,the CEO of the defunct Capital Bank and two others were accused of stealing and money laundering that led to the collapse of the bank. While, on the 8th of July 2021, the High Court in Ghana  acquitted and discharged her from the criminal prosecution.

References 

21st-century Ghanaian businesswomen
21st-century Ghanaian businesspeople
Year of birth missing (living people)